Jodie Michelle Clatworthy (born 3 April 1972), also known by her married name Jodie Housman, is an Australian former competitive swimmer and individual medley specialist.

As a 16-year-old, Clatworthy represented Australia at the 1988 Summer Olympics in Seoul, South Korea.  She competed in the 200-metre and 400-metre individual medley events, advanced to the final of both, and finished fourth and sixth, respectively.

Clatworthy is a three-time Commonwealth Games silver medallist.  At the 1986 Commonwealth Games in Edinburgh, Scotland, she won her first silver in the women's 400-metre individual medley, finishing behind fellow Australian Suzie Landells.  Four years later when Auckland, New Zealand hosted the 1990 Commonwealth Games, she qualified for both individual medley events.  In the 200-metre individual medley, she came second behind Canadian Nancy Sweetman, and in the 400-metre individual medley event she was runner-up to Australian Hayley Lewis.

Clatworthy is married to fellow Australian Olympic swimmer Glen Housman.

See also
 List of alumni of Brisbane State High School
 List of Commonwealth Games medallists in swimming (women)

References

Bibliography
 

1972 births
Living people
Commonwealth Games silver medallists for Australia
Australian female medley swimmers
Olympic swimmers of Australia
People educated at Brisbane State High School
Swimmers at the 1986 Commonwealth Games
Swimmers at the 1988 Summer Olympics
Swimmers at the 1990 Commonwealth Games
Commonwealth Games medallists in swimming
20th-century Australian women
Medallists at the 1986 Commonwealth Games
Medallists at the 1990 Commonwealth Games